Toys is the second album by pianist Uri Caine featuring four compositions by Herbie Hancock which was first released on the JMT label in 1995.

Reception

In her review for Allmusic, Heather Phares said "Toys continues Uri Caine's integration of disparate styles into jazz...  his technical brilliance and mercurial style shine". Writing for All About Jazz, Robert R. Calder said "neither the most spontaneous nor always the most profound. Technical accomplishment it does have in spades, however".

Track listing
All compositions by Uri Caine except as indicated
 "Time Will Tell" - 7:54  
 "The Prisoner" (Herbie Hancock) - 10:39  
 "Herbal Blue" - 5:47  
 "Or Truth?" - 7:22  
 "Yellow Stars in Heaven" - 9:05  
 "Over & Out" - 7:53  
 "Dolphin Dance" (Hancock) - 2:06  
 "Toys" (Hancock) - 7:26  
 "Cantaloupe Island" (Hancock) - 4:40  
 "Woodpecker" - 4:25  
 "I'm Meshugah for My Sugah (And My Sugah's Meshugah for Me)" - 1:41

Personnel
Uri Caine - piano
Dave Douglas - trumpet
Don Byron - bass clarinet
Josh Roseman - trombone
Gary Thomas - tenor saxophone, flute
Dave Holland - bass
Ralph Peterson, Jr., - drums
Don Alias - percussion

References

JMT Records albums
Winter & Winter Records albums
Uri Caine albums
1996 albums